Winkler may refer to:

 Winkler (surname), people with the surname Winkler or Winckler
 Winkler scale, also known as the heat summation scale for classifying climates
 Winkler (crater), a crater on the Moon
 6473 Winkler, an asteroid
 Winkler method, a test to determine dissolved oxygen concentration in water 
 Winkler vine, an example of large-vine grape culture
 Winkler (novel), by Giles Coren
 Winkler + Dünnebier, German machine building company

 Places
 Winkler, Manitoba, a Canadian city
 Winkler, Kansas, an unincorporated community 
 Winkler, Missouri, an unincorporated community
 Winkler County, Texas, a county in the state of Texas